Alekova is a rural locality (a village) in Yorgvinskoye Rural Settlement, Kudymkarsky District, Perm Krai, Russia. The population was 154 as of 2010. There are 10 streets.

Geography 
Alekova is located 17 km north of Kudymkar (the district's administrative centre) by road. Murmarova is the nearest rural locality.

References 

Rural localities in Kudymkarsky District